Marriage on the Rocks is a 1965 comedy film starring Frank Sinatra, Deborah Kerr, and Dean Martin about a businessman's wife who ends up divorced by mistake and then married to his best friend by an even bigger mistake. The film was written by Cy Howard and directed by Jack Donohue.

Marriage on the Rocks is not a musical, even though it pairs Sinatra and Martin. The picture would be their last feature film partnership for nearly 20 years, when they appeared together briefly in 1984's Cannonball Run II.

Plot
After nineteen years of marriage, workaholic Dan Edwards's wife Valerie is frustrated. Rather than tending to her needs at home, Dan spends most of his time at an ad agency he runs with old friend, Ernie Brewer, a laid-back bachelor and Dan's second-in-command. Once a real swinger, Dan has become a bore to his whole family. By contrast, the kids look up to the exciting "Uncle Ernie", who is always there to give advice. Valerie likes it that Ernie does things her husband won't – dances with her, compliments her, even picks out the gifts Dan buys for her. At one point, Val becomes so impatient she seeks a lawyer's advice concerning divorce. Back at the office, Ernie can see what his best friend is blind to, so he urges Dan to take his wife on a second honeymoon to Mexico.

Once there, in a land of quickie marriages and divorces, Dan and Val get into an argument in front of proprietor Miguel Santos, and, before they know it, they're divorced. But an apologetic Dan makes it up to her and arranges for them to be remarried right away. However, an urgent business matter requires his presence back home to save his company's biggest account. Valerie stays in Mexico to await Dan's return. But the business matter is extended and Ernie has to travel to Mexico to explain everything to Val, unaware that she's already put the wedding ceremony in motion. By mistake, she ends up married to Ernie.

Once over the shock, Ernie anticipates a quickie divorce, but Val thinks she might enjoy the new arrangement. Dan, fed up with both of them, decides he's not exactly broken-hearted either. He re-discovers the joys of bachelorhood, cavorting with Ernie's sexy playmates. As for poor Ernie, it's now up to him to run the business, which turns him into the same dull, inattentive husband that her first spouse had been. In the end, however, everything is put right.

Cast

 Frank Sinatra as Dan Edwards
 Deborah Kerr as Valerie Edwards
 Dean Martin as Ernie Brewer
 Nancy Sinatra as Tracy Edwards
 Tony Bill as Jim Blake
 Joi Lansing as Lola
 Cesar Romero as Miguel Santos
 John McGiver as Shad Nathan
 Hermione Baddeley as Mrs. Ginny MacPherson
 Trini Lopez as himself
 David Shriver as himself (uncredited)
 DeForest Kelley as Mr. Turner
 Kathleen Freeman as Miss Blight
 Parley Baer as Dr. Newman (uncredited)
 Reta Shaw as Saleslady at Saks (uncredited)

Production
The film originally began under the title of Divorce American Style with Frank Sinatra personally selecting Deborah Kerr for the role of his wife.  Cy Howard's original screenplay was deemed offensive and rewritten under the title Community Property over a period of four months, then given its final title.
After a preview, Warner Bros cut out 14 minutes before its release to underwhelming reviews in September 1965.  Nancy Sinatra was a last minute replacement for Mia Farrow. The new title proved apt as during the filming Nancy Sinatra broke up with her husband Tommy Sands.

The Mexican Government was offended by the film's depiction of Mexico and banned the film and other Sinatra films for what they regarded as a derogatory depiction of the nation.

Shots of Dean Martin's actual house appeared in the film as did a Ford Mustang and a Ford Thunderbird customised by George Barris.

See also
 List of American films of 1965

Notes

External links 
 
 
 
 
 

1965 films
1965 romantic comedy films
1960s English-language films
American romantic comedy films
American screwball comedy films
Censored films
Comedy of remarriage films
Films about advertising
Films directed by Jack Donohue
Films scored by Nelson Riddle
Films set in Mexico
Warner Bros. films
1960s American films